Phlorizin  is a glucoside of phloretin, a dihydrochalcone. A white solid, samples often appear yellow owing to impurities. It is of sweet taste and contains four molecules of water in the crystal. Above 200 °C, it decomposes to give rufin.  It is poorly soluble in ether and cold water, but soluble in ethanol and hot water.  Upon prolonged exposure to aqueous solutions phlorizin hydrolyzes to phloretin and glucose.

Occurrence
Phlorizin is found primarily in unripe Malus (apple) root bark of apple, and trace amounts have been found in strawberry. In Malus, it is most abundant in vegetative tissues (such as leaves and bark) and seeds. Closely related species, such as pear (Pyrus communis), cherry, and other fruit trees in the Rosaceae do not contain phloridzin. Phloridzin is a phytochemical that belongs to the class of polyphenols. In natural sources, it may occur with other polyphenols such as quercetin, catechin, epicatechin, procyanidins, and rutin.

Pharmacology
Phlorizin is an inhibitor of SGLT1 and SGLT2 because it competes with D-glucose for binding to the carrier; this action reduces renal glucose transport, lowering the amount of glucose in the blood. Phlorizin was studied as a potential pharmaceutical treatment for type 2 diabetes, but has since been superseded by more selective and more promising synthetic analogs, such as empagliflozin, canagliflozin and dapagliflozin. Phlorizin is not an effective drug because when orally consumed, it is nearly entirely converted into phloretin by hydrolytic enzymes in the small intestine.

References

Dihydrochalcones
Phenol glucosides